Bajekan is a village in Sirsa district in the Indian state of Haryana named after Baaz-E-Khan Cheema. The Bhukar Jats are the oldest known residents of Bajekan. After independence many communities came to the village. 
There is a Government Senior Secondary located in Bajekan, a girls primary school and a number of other private schools. Agriculture is the occupation of majority. Bagri, Saraiki and Punjabi are spoken throughout the village.

References

Villages in Sirsa district